Ajantha may refer to:

Ajanta Caves, a UNESCO World Heritage Site near Ajantha, Maharashtra
Ajantha, Maharashtra, a village in Maharashtra, India
Ajantha (1987 film), a 1987 Indian Malayalam-language film starring Shankar
Ajantha (2009 film), a 2009 Indian Tamil-language film starring Ramana
Ajantha (2012 film), a 2012 Indian Malayalam-language film starring Vinu Mohan and Honey Rose
Ajantha Mendis (born 1985), Sri Lankan cricketer

See also
Ajanta (disambiguation)